The Howard A. Hall House, located in Eugene, Oregon, is listed on the National Register of Historic Places.

See also
 National Register of Historic Places listings in Lane County, Oregon

References

Houses on the National Register of Historic Places in Eugene, Oregon